Irvingia is a genus of African and Southeast Asian trees in the family Irvingiaceae, sometimes known by the common names wild mango, African mango, bush mango, dika, mbukpap uyo  or ogbono. They bear edible mango-like fruits, and are especially valued for their fat- and protein-rich nuts.

The fruit is a large drupe, with fibrous flesh. The subtly aromatic nuts are typically dried in the sun for preservation, and are sold whole or in powder form. They may be ground to a paste known variously as dika bread or Gabon chocolate. Their high content of mucilage enables them to be used as thickening agents for dishes such as ogbono soup. The nuts may also be pressed for vegetable oil.

The trees yield a hard wood, useful in construction.

Irvingia was described as a genus in 1860. It is native to Africa and Southeast Asia. The genus is named in honour of Edward George Irving, a Royal Navy surgeon.

Species
List of species:

References

External links 

Irvingiaceae
Malpighiales genera
Edible fruits